Luigino Mario Vascon (13 October 1956 – 19 June 2022) was an Italian politician.

A member of the Lega Nord, he served in the Chamber of Deputies from 1996 to 2006.

Vascon died in Sossano on 19 June 2022 at the age of 65.

References

1956 births
2022 deaths
Deputies of Legislature XIII of Italy
Deputies of Legislature XIV of Italy
Lega Nord politicians
People from the Province of Vicenza